Spelt in many ways Vidyadayanee (Vidyadayinee), (Vidyadayani ) High School is situated in the Surathkal locality of Mangalore city of Karnataka State in India. It was established by Hindu Vidyadayanee Sangha in 1944. It is one of the largest high schools in Dakshina Kannada and Udupi districts with more than 1000 students studying in classes 8, 9 and 10 (SSLC). It is affiliated to SSLC board of Karnataka. The school is located to east of NH-17 now renumbered as NH-66 adjoining Govindadasa College. The school has its own building, large playground, library and laboratories. The Vidyadayanee High School has provided education to thousands of poor people from rural areas.

The school has both Kannada and English medium sections. It means medium of instruction is Kannada and English.

The Hindu Vidyadayanee Sangha was founded by Iddya Krishnayya with an aim to safeguard the interests of Hindus during the British rule in the backdrop of conversion. The school initially started functioning in the backyard of Iddya Mahalingeshwara temple and slowly flourished into the existing campus, sprawling across acres of land.

References
Official website

Educational institutions established in 1944
Schools in Dakshina Kannada district
1944 establishments in India
High schools and secondary schools in Karnataka